Peziza arvernensis is a species of apothecial fungus belonging to the family Pezizaceae. This fungus appears as brown cups, often in small groups, on soil in broad-leaved woodland, especially with beech. This species is widespread in Europe with a few records from North and South America.

The exterior of the fruit bodies is pale tan, while the interior is brown. Peziza vesiculosa and P. violacea are similar, young specimens of the latter having a violet hue.

References

Further reading

External links

Peziza arvernensis at GBIF

Pezizaceae
Fungi described in 1879
Fungi of Europe
Fungi of South America
Taxa named by Jean Louis Émile Boudier